Marine Corps Air Station El Toro  was a United States Marine Corps Air Station located next to the community of El Toro, near Irvine, California.

Before it was decommissioned in 1999, it was the  home of Marine Corps Aviation on the West Coast. While it was active, all U.S. Presidents in the post-World War II era landed in Air Force One at this airfield. The El Toro "Flying Bull" patch was designed by Walt Disney Studios in 1944. It survived virtually unchanged until the close of the Air Station.

Following its decommissioning the site was used as a filming location, including the test track for the United States version of the BBC's Top Gear franchise. About  of land originally taken by the air station was converted into a large recreational center, the Orange County Great Park, while the rest was re-zoned for residential and commercial development.

History

In May 1942, Lieutenant Colonel William Fox was directed to select the sites for all of the Marine Corps' West Coast air stations. Fox sought the most expeditious and low cost option and thus chose the already existing airports of El Centro, Mojave and Santa Barbara. For the fourth station, he chose land that had previously been looked at by the U.S. Navy for a blimp base. The Marine Corps gave the owner of the land, a farmer named James Irvine Sr., $100,000 for  including  designated for a blimp base. Construction of MCAS El Toro began on August 3, 1942 on land previously owned by the Irvine Company. The company greatly resisted the station's construction at this site, which at the time contained the largest lima bean field in North America, which was the company's prime source of revenue. The name "El Toro" came from the nearby small community which in 1940 only had a population of 130 people.

The base headquarters was established on November 4, 1942 and the first landing occurred in late November when a Major Michael Carmichael, flying from Camp Kearny, was forced to make an emergency landing among the construction equipment. The runways and taxiways were completed by 1 December 1942 and all squadron hangars were complete by 15 January 1943. Barracks and officer's quarters were ready by 20 January. January 1943 also saw the first operational units arriving at MCAS El Toro. First aboard were Marine Aircraft Group 41 and VMF-113. They were followed later in the month by VMSB-142, VMF-224, VMSB-231 and VMSB-232, who were returning from fighting during the Battle of Guadalcanal in order to re-organize, re-equip and train. The station was formally commissioned on 17 March 1943, with Colonel Theodore B. Millard as the first commanding officer.  Soon after its opening, MCAS El Toro was handling the largest tactical aerodrome traffic on the Pacific Coast.

Already the largest Marine Corps air station on the West Coast, in 1944, funds were approved to double its size and operations. By the end of 1944, the base was home to 1,248 officers and 6,831 enlisted personnel.

In 1950, El Toro was selected as a permanent Master Jet Base for the Fleet Marine Force, Pacific.
To support this new role, the aviation infrastructure at El Toro was expanded significantly. For most of the ensuing years, El Toro served as the primary base for Marine Corps west coast fighter squadrons. During the 1960s, many US Marines left for and returned from Vietnam at El Toro MCAS.  In 1958, Marine Corps Air Station Miami was closed which brought the 3rd Marine Aircraft Wing to El Toro.

During the presidency of Richard Nixon, MCAS El Toro was used for flights to and from his "Western White House" at San Clemente, California. On August 9, 1974, after resigning the Presidency in the wake of the Watergate scandal, Richard and Pat Nixon flew from Andrews Air Force Base, Maryland to El Toro aboard VC-137C SAM 27000.

The land originally surrounding the base was mostly used for agricultural purposes when it first opened, but in the late 1980s and early 1990s, residential development began in the area; most of it was directly in the path of the base's runways, which proved to be a major problem as the constant loud noise produced by jets and helicopters passing overhead was very irritating to those living in the area. Few desired to move there because of this, causing the new neighborhoods to struggle.

In 1993, MCAS El Toro was designated for closing by the Base Realignment and Closure Commission and all of its activities were to be transferred to Marine Corps Air Station Miramar. The station officially closed on July 2, 1999.

Environmental remediation

Before the site could be developed for civilian use, the Department of the Navy (which oversees both the Navy and the Marine Corps) was required to perform environmental remediation to clean up contaminated soil on the site. The contamination was caused by volatile organic compounds (VOCs), primarily industrial solvents that had been used over the years for purposes such as degreasing, paint stripping, and the cleaning of aircraft.

Over the years, the VOCs had seeped into the groundwater, resulting in a plume of contaminated groundwater extending for three miles (5 km) to the west of the station. In July 2005, the Department of the Navy's Base Realignment and Closure (BRAC) Program Management Office (PMO) issued a public notice stating that the cleanup of the contaminated soil was complete.
The cleanup of the groundwater is being handled by the Irvine Desalter Project, a project of two local water authorities that has financial backing from the Navy and the State of California.

Conversion proposals
The closing of MCAS El Toro ignited a political firestorm over the eventual fate of the facility. With the existing infrastructure, some favored converting the base into an  international airport. Those favoring the new airport tended to come from northern Orange County (desiring the convenience of a closer airport), and from areas in Newport Beach that are within the arrival and departure noise zones surrounding  John Wayne Airport (hoping to close that airport in favor of the new one at El Toro).

Those against the airport proposal were largely residents of the cities in the immediate vicinity of El Toro, such as Irvine, Lake Forest, Laguna Niguel, Laguna Woods, Dana Point, and Mission Viejo, where residents were alarmed at the idea of the aircraft noise. The cities opposed to the airport created a joint powers authority, the El Toro Reuse Planning Authority (ETRPA), to oppose the project. They were joined in the effort by grass-roots organizations that collected record numbers of signatures on petitions to place anti-airport initiatives on the ballot and raised funds for the election campaigns. This faction lobbied strongly in favor of other uses for the property. The city of Irvine sought to annex the property for park and related uses.

The battle between pro-airport and anti-airport groups dominated Orange County politics for much of the late 1990s and early 2000s. From 1994 to 2001, $80 million in county and city funds was spent on campaigning for both sides. Airport proposals were defeated in two hotly contested ballot initiatives, and further challenges took place in the courts. A series of demonstration commercial flights from the airport in June 1999 generated less noise than the former military flights, but resulted in much public outcry due to the use of different flight paths from the military, and incessant circling over nearby cities to line up for another approach. Eventually the airport opponents prevailed, and in March 2002, the Department of Defense announced that it would sell the land to private interests to be developed into Orange County Great Park.

Sale
The Department of the Navy hired the General Services Administration and Los Angeles-based Colliers International to assist in the sale of MCAS El Toro. Colliers branded the project as Heritage Fields combining the long-standing history of the base and what the future of the base will be to the community and the generations to come. An online auction was conducted and in February 2005, the final bid of $650 million was accepted for the four parcels of land comprising the former MCAS El Toro. The auction winner was Heritage Fields LLC, a joint venture between Lennar and several other firms. Development plans for the  site include residential, golf, commercial, R&D, and schools.  of the site will be dedicated to the Great Park. A ceremony to formally transfer ownership of the property to Heritage Fields LLC was held on August 29, 2005.

Accidents and incidents
November 19, 1958: An F4D Skyray fighter jet overshoots the runway and is struck by a southbound San Diegan. Train No. 74 hits the F4D at 75 miles (121 km)-per-hour. All three locomotive units and cars #3430, #3165, #3144, #1399, #3100, #3094, #3082 derail after hitting the F4D. No fatalities and only a few injuries result.
 On June 25, 1965, a U.S. Air Force Boeing C-135A bound for Okinawa crashed just after takeoff at MCAS El Toro, killing all eighty-four on board.
 On Jan 23, 1967, two Douglas A-4 Skyhawk jets were wing-tipping on approach. Pilot Frank Gambelli had lost his radio in a rainstorm, and he was wing-tipping with Pilot James Powell over Leisure World on approach. Visibility was practically zero. The two jets collided and both pilots ejected. Pilot Powell ejected safely, but was thrown into the side of a building when his parachute caught on the top of the building and was slammed into it and died. Pilot Gambelli landed next to St. Nicholas Catholic Church just at the end of service. GSgt H.W. Oviatt raced out of the church and took pilot Gambelli back to the base.
 On July 30, 1970, a Lockheed Martin KC-130F of VMGR-352 crashed and burned during a maximum effort landing, killing 4 of 5 crewmen on board.
 On June 6, 1971, a midair collision occurred between Hughes Airwest Flight 706 Douglas DC-9 jetliner and a Marine Corps F-4B Phantom being flown to MCAS El Toro, claiming 50 lives. The DC-9, with 44 passengers and 5 crew members aboard, impacted into a remote canyon approximately three miles north of Duarte, California along with one of the crew members of the fighter whose wreckage was found in another canyon approximately .75 miles southeast of the DC-9's crash site. One of the Marines in the fighter survived the accident.
 On July 4, 1986, 21-year-old Marine Lance Corporal, Howard Foote Jr., an aviation mechanic at El Toro, took an A-4 Skyhawk on an unauthorized 90-minute joyride over southern California. Foote, an accomplished glider pilot, was despondent after learning that due to a medical condition, he would never be able to fly in the Marines. He landed the aircraft safely and was subsequently discharged under less than honorable conditions after serving  months in confinement.
 On Feb 12, 1987, a CH-46E helicopter from HMM-764, MAG-46 crashed, shortly after takeoff, into a steep, brush-covered ridge between Bell and Trabuco canyons. All three crewmembers on board, Major Dudley Urban, Major William Anderson, and Staff Sergeant Bradley Baird, died in the crash.
 On April 24, 1988, Marine Corps Colonel Jerry Cadick, then commanding officer of MAG-11, was performing a tactical aerial demonstration at the MCAS El Toro Air Show before a crowd of 300,000 when he crashed his F/A-18 Hornet at the bottom of a loop that was too close to the ground. Col. Cadick was subjected to extremely high G-forces that resulted in his face making contact with the control stick and sustaining serious injury. He broke his arm, elbow and ribs, exploded a vertebra and collapsed a lung. Col. Cadick survived and retired from the Marine Corps. The crashed F/A-18 remained largely intact but was beyond repair.

 On January 22, 1991, Marine Corps Colonel James Sabow apparently committed suicide amid allegations of base corruption, specifically using military aircraft for personal use. His family and friends denied he committed suicide and pointed out that Col. Sabow had pledged to fight the charges against him just minutes before his death in phone conversations with other officers. According to a 1996 lawsuit, Sabow was murdered because he threatened to expose an authorized covert operation at El Toro involving some of his fellow officers, CIA-sponsored airlifts to Central and South America, running arms and drugs. A forensic analysis conducted appeared to indicate the death was homicide and that evidence had been altered.
 On 2 May 1993, during the 1993 MCAS El Toro airshow, an F-86 Sabre crashed on the runway after failing to pull out of a vertical loop. The F-86 pilot, James A. Gregory, died on impact. No one was hurt on the ground. The airshow continued. Normally the F-86 performed with a MiG-15, but the pilot of the MiG-15 was ill that day and the F-86 was doing a solo run.

Notable events
The MCAS El Toro Air Show took place annually from the 1950s until 1997. It featured the U.S. Navy Blue Angels, as well as the USAF Thunderbirds. The Air Show also featured new aircraft that were coming into active service, such as the B-2 stealth bomber. Other displays featured military vehicles. The show also had a large gathering of vendors of military items and memorabilia. The final Air Show in 1997 drew an estimated two million visitors.
 MCAS El Toro was regularly used for flight operations by Special Air Missions during President Richard Nixon's term in office, in support of the "Western White House," Nixon's home at San Clemente. The final Nixon flights were, first, when he landed there upon resigning the White House in 1974, and again, after his death in 1994, when his body was flown to California for burial. He flew both times in his Air Force One, SAM 27000.
 In 2006, an abandoned F/A-18 hangar in Irvine California was sealed to create, in effect, a giant pinhole camera, and a panoramic print of the El Toro Air Station was formed on a light-sensitive muslin cloth measuring 111 feet wide, 32 feet high. Under the direction of Laguna Beach photographer Jacques Garnier, the image, known as “The Great Picture,” was originally produced as part of the Legacy Project - a photographic and historical record of the base before being transformed into what is now the Orange County Great Park. This is believed to be the largest photographic image ever taken by a camera.
 From 2005 to 2012, depending on the year, there were small air shows, fireworks, family New Year's Eve (the balloon dropped at 9 pm) and other events related to Growing the Park, at the Great Park, the new name for the site.

See also

List of United States Marine Corps air stations
Naval Air Station Los Alamitos Naval Outlying Landing Fields also used by Marine Corps Air Station El Toro in World War 2

Notes

References

Books

External links
Official
Department of the Navy - Base Realignment and Closure Program Management Office 
Other
Info on the air station from Abandoned & Little-Known Airfields
HD commercial footage filmed on location

Airports in Orange County, California
Defunct airports in California
El Toro
Military installations closed in 1999
Formerly Used Defense Sites in California
Military facilities in Greater Los Angeles
History of Irvine, California
Military Superfund sites
Buildings and structures in Orange County, California
History of Orange County, California
World War II airfields in the United States
Superfund sites in California
Airports established in 1942
Airports disestablished in 1999